The  occurred on 5 April 1964 in Machida, Tokyo, Japan. A United States Marine Corps Vought RF-8A Crusader, BuNo 146891, which was returning as one half of a two-plane flight of Crusaders from Kadena Air Base, Okinawa to its home base of Naval Air Facility Atsugi, Kanagawa Prefecture, suffered a mechanical malfunction. It subsequently crashed into a residential neighborhood in the Hara-Machida area of Machida City (near present-day JR Machida Station) in Tokyo, Japan. The other aircraft landed safely at Atsugi.

The crash killed four people and injured 32 others on the ground.  The stricken aircraft's pilot, Captain R. L. Bown of Seattle, Washington, successfully ejected at 5,000 feet and landed on a car, suffering minor bruises. The accident destroyed seven houses. Three of the four fatalities were caused by debris from the collapsed houses, and the fourth was from pieces of the destroyed aircraft.

Japanese media questioned why Bown was not able to steer the aircraft away from the residential area before ejecting.

See also
1959 Okinawa F-100 crash
1977 Yokohama F-4 crash

References

United States Navy in the 20th century
Accidents and incidents involving United States Navy and Marine Corps aircraft
Aviation accidents and incidents in 1964
Aviation accidents and incidents in Japan
United States Marine Corps in the 20th century
United States military in Japan
Machida F8 crash, 1964
Japan–United States relations
Western Tokyo
April 1964 events in Asia